Asia is a brand of sarsaparilla produced by Chinese private corporation Xiangxue Pharmaceutical via its subsidiary Xiangxue–Asian Beverage. However, the brand was still owned by Guangzhou Municipal People's Government (via GLIG).

Asia's sarsaparilla was considered as a collective memory of the citizens of Guangzhou, Guangdong.

History
The "Asia" brand soft drinks began to be produced in Guangzhou in 1946. The brand and factory became nationalized after the establishment of the People's Republic of China in 1949. Along with its sister brand "Pearl", they also exported to the nearby British colony Hong Kong since 1960s, in various kind of favour, such as Apple.

It formed a joint venture (Pepsi-Asia Beverage Co. Ltd.) with PepsiCo in 1993. Pepsi abandoned the "Asia" brand and its products such as sarsaparilla. The joint venture became known as Guangzhou Asia Beverage Co., Ltd. in 2017 after being re-acquired by Guangzhou Municipal People's Government (via Guangzhou Light Industrial And Trade Group (GLIG)). 

The rights to use the brand was also acquired by Xiangxue Pharmaceutical via another joint venture (Xiangxue owned 63.00% stake as of 2016; GLIG was a minority shareholder): Xiangxue Asian Beverage, which was incorporated in 2009. The new joint venture also rented the factory from the government which was owned by Guangzhou Asia Beverage.

Sub-brand

Footnotes

References

Further reading
 

Products introduced in 1946
Chinese drinks
Drink brands
Carbonated drinks